Eric Thomas Knechtges, DM (born April 16, 1978 in Lansing, MI) is an American composer.  He has written works for a wide variety of performing mediums including: concert band, orchestra, a cappella choir, and chamber ensembles (including some works using computer music technology).

Biography
Eric Knechtges has studied at the Indiana University (Bloomington) Jacobs School of Music (DM), Bowling Green State University (MM) and Michigan State University (BMusEd); he has also taught music (band, chorus, and music appreciation) at Addison Community Schools in Michigan.  He has been an active conductor of bands and orchestras, including the Pride of Indy Band and Color Guard.

His composition, Broken Silents, was recognized for Special Distinction in the second annual American Society of Composers, Authors and Publishers ASCAP/CBDNA Frederick Fennell Competition.  He has also been recognized in the National Bandmasters Association Young Composers Mentor Project, the National Association of Composers, USA Young Composers Competition, and the San Francisco Choral Artists New Voices Composition Competition, and the “Juan Bautista Comes” Choral Competition.  His works have been performed by ensembles and artists throughout the United States, including the Michigan State University Symphony Band, the Bowling Green State University A Cappella Chorus, the Indiana University Symphonic Band, tubists Timothy Olt  and Philip Sinder, cellist Suren Bagratuni, the San Francisco Choral Artists, the Governor's School of North Carolina, and the Purdue University Wind Ensemble.

Knechtges is also one of eighteen featured composers in the fourth edition of Composers on Composing for Band series written by Mark Camphouse.

Works
 Aporia (2012), for euphonium and concert band
 Capriccio (2011), for tuba and piano 
 Dali Hexaptych (2010), for brass choir
 Out Of C, for mixed ensemble (2008)
 Reflections on the River (2008), for tuba, cello, and piano
 Tie-Line March (2008), for concert band
 Things Left Unsaid (2008), for orchestra
 Amherst Posy (2007), for soprano, flute/alto flute/piccolo, and guitar
 Between (2007), for multiple percussion duet
 Mi Mariposa (2007), for concert band (based on melodies by Bloomington, IN elementary school children) 
 To Build a Rainbow (2006, rev. 2007), for concert band
 O Nata Lux (2006), for mixed chorus
 Blaze (2006), for brass ensemble
 Synthetic Diversions (2006), for two-channel tape
 Winter Night (2006), for mixed chorus in just intonation 
 Narrow Road to the Deep North (2006), for voice and Max/MSP
 Three Degrees of Separation (2005), for flute, clarinet, viola, cello, and marimba
 The Mystic Trumpeter (2005), for flügelhorn, baritone, and piano
 Exotherm (2005), for wind quintet (featured at Midwest Composer's Symposium 2007) 
 Bogoroditse Djevo (2005), for soprano, euphonium, and piano
 Sic Enim Dilexit Deus Mundum (2005), for mixed chorus
 Sonos (2005), for mixed chorus
 The Sunset (2004), for mixed chorus
 Autumn Twilight (2004), for mixed chorus in just intonation
 A Moment's Peace (2004), for orchestra
 Caritas (2004), for mixed chorus
 Time for a Dream (2004), for two-channel tape
 Flag Salute (2004), for chamber ensemble
 Come and Be My Baby (2004), for soprano, alto saxophone, and piano
 Der Jagd (2003), for horn and piano
 Carpe Diem (2003), for concert band
 Jackson Fanfare (2003), for concert band
 October Prayer (2003), for mixed chorus
 A Metamusical Sonata (2002), for bassoon and piano
 Fleurs d'Eté (2002), for string quintet
 Broken Silents (2000), for concert band
 Song for a Rainy Day (200), for alto saxophone and piano
 The Kinsey Scale (2000), for baritone saxophone and harpsichord
 Oboists Three (2000), for oboe trio
 Dry Tears of November (1999), for trombone choir
 Michigan Moods (1996), for orchestra
 Midnight Caffeine (1996, rev. 2006), for tuba-euphonium quartet
 In Limine (1996), for concert band
 ¿Qué Pasa? (1995, rev. 2004), for tuba and piano

References

American male classical composers
American classical composers
20th-century classical composers
21st-century classical composers
Living people
Microtonal musicians
1978 births
21st-century American composers
Musicians from Lansing, Michigan
20th-century American composers
Classical musicians from Michigan
20th-century American male musicians
21st-century American male musicians